The 15th Legislative Assembly of Ontario was in session from October 20, 1919, until May 10, 1923, just prior to the 1923 general election. The leading party in the chamber after the election was the United Farmers of Ontario. It formed a coalition government with 11 Labour MLAs and three Independent candidates of varying stripes. 

The coalition held a slight majority of the seats and the parties it represented had taken about 34 percent of the vote in the 1919 election. The rest of the votes had been split between the Conservatives, the Liberals and others, many of which were unsuccessful candidates. (Under First past the post, any votes cast for unsuccessful candidates are simply disregarded.) 

The UFO derived a benefit from winning many rural seats where the number of votes involved were less than in the urban districts. In North Brant the UFO candidate won while receiving only 3600 votes while in Ottawa West the Conservative candidate took 9000 votes to win his seat.

The party approached Ernest Charles Drury, who had not run in the election, to serve as party leader and premier. Drury had not run in the 1919 election and was elected in a by-election held in Halton in 1920. He made it known that the coalition government party should be known by the name "The People's Party."

Most of the seats the United Farmers won were taken at the expense of the Conservative party, who had formed the government in the preceding assembly and would again regain power in 1923.

Nelson Parliament served as speaker for the assembly.

The power wielded by the UFO-Labour coalition enabled the passage of progressive Labour and farmer legislation. The government created the first Department of Welfare for the province and brought in allowances for widows and children, a minimum wage for women and standardized adoption procedures. The government also expanded Ontario Hydro and promoted rural electrification, created the Province of Ontario Savings Office - a provincially owned bank that lent money to farmers at a lower rate - began the first major reforestation program in North America, and began construction of the modern highway system.

The government was a strict enforcer of the Ontario Temperance Act, enacted in 1916, and Prohibition stayed in force until 1927.

The 1923 election saw the UFO-Labour coalition government defeated by a re-energized Conservative Party. The UFO  vote stayed solid as compared to 1919 but the UFO suffered under First past the post and took about half the seats it was due.

In 1924 (after the 1923 election), the provincial treasurer was found guilty of conspiracy to defraud the government following a series of events known as the Ontario Bond Scandal.

In the waning days of the UFO-Labour government, the government attempted to reform the province's electoral system (to introduce proportional representation) but the effort failed, in part due to Conservative opposition. The UFO suffered under the First past the post electoral system used in the 1923 election, taking just about half the seats they were due proportionally.

Members elected to the Assembly
Italicized names indicate members returned by acclamation.

Timeline

External links 
Members in Parliament 15

References 

Terms of the Legislative Assembly of Ontario
1919 establishments in Ontario
1923 disestablishments in Ontario